The Palmyra Boy Scout Cabin is located in Palmyra, Wisconsin. It was added to the State and the National Register of Historic Places in 2017.

References

Clubhouses on the National Register of Historic Places in Wisconsin
Log buildings and structures on the National Register of Historic Places in Wisconsin
National Register of Historic Places in Jefferson County, Wisconsin
Boy Scouts of America
Rustic architecture in Wisconsin
Late 19th and Early 20th Century American Movements architecture
Buildings and structures completed in 1937